Eddie López may refer to:
Eddie López (journalist) (1940–1971), journalist from Puerto Rico